Blue Jasmine is a 2013 American comedy-drama film written and directed by Woody Allen. The film tells the story of a rich Manhattan socialite (Cate Blanchett) who falls on hard times and has to move into her working-class sister's (Sally Hawkins) apartment in San Francisco.

The film received a limited release on July 26, 2013, in New York and Los Angeles, before expanding nationwide on August 23, 2013. The film was met with critical acclaim, with praise towards Blanchett & Hawkins' performance, and Allen's screenplay. Blanchett won the Academy Award for Best Actress, and Hawkins and Allen were nominated for Best Supporting Actress and Original Screenplay. Blanchett also won the Golden Globe Award, the SAG Award, and the BAFTA Award for Best Actress in a Leading Role. The film was also a box office success, earning $99.1 million worldwide against a budget of $18 million.

Plot
Jasmine Francis disembarks in San Francisco after a flight from New York City. She takes a taxi to her sister Ginger's apartment, where Ginger is dismayed to learn that Jasmine traveled first class despite claiming to be broke. Jasmine has recently suffered a nervous breakdown, and having incurred heavy debts, has been forced to seek refuge with her sister.

A series of flashbacks reveals that Jasmine's husband, money manager Hal Francis, was arrested for defrauding his clients. Ginger and her husband, Augie, were among Hal's victims; he swindled them out of $200,000 in lottery winnings that Augie had wanted to start a business with, and their marriage fell apart. Hal dies by suicide in prison after being publicly disgraced. Jasmine's stepson Danny subsequently dropped out of Harvard and severed all ties with Jasmine. Following Hal's death, Jasmine began drinking heavily and abusing anti-anxiety medication. She also developed a habit of talking to herself about her past.

Ginger is now dating a mechanic called Chili, whom Jasmine detests for his lowbred and coarse manners. Jasmine considers becoming an interior designer because of her "great taste" and past experience in decorating her homes. She wants to take online courses, but having no computer skills, she decides to take a class in computers to gain basic proficiency. With no income, she grudgingly takes a job as a receptionist with a dentist, who harasses her with unwanted sexual advances. When he assaults her, she fights him off and quits.

Jasmine's situation improves when she meets a wealthy widower, Dwight Westlake, at a party in Marin County north of San Francisco. Dwight is a diplomat aspiring to become a congressman. She poses as an interior designer, telling him that her husband was a surgeon who died of a heart attack. Dwight is impressed by her stylishness and invites her to decorate his new home. Ginger begins a romance with Al, whom she met at the same party. She breaks up with Chili, who begs her not to leave him. Eventually, she discovers that Al is married and reconciles with Chili, realizing she has been influenced by Jasmine to believe Chili was beneath her.

Jasmine develops a romance with Dwight, and he is about to buy her an engagement ring, when they bump into Augie outside the jewelry store. Augie rails at Jasmine about what Hal did to Ginger and him. Augie also reveals that Danny is living nearby in Oakland and is now married. Dwight is outraged that Jasmine lied to him and calls off the engagement. Jasmine goes to Oakland and finds Danny, who tells Jasmine he never wants to see her again because of what she did to his father.

It is revealed that Jasmine finally learned of Hal's many affairs and confronted him. When he told her he wanted to divorce her to be with a 19-year-old au pair, Jasmine, in a moment of blind rage, called the FBI to inform the authorities of Hal's fraudulent business dealings, which led to his arrest, and subsequent suicide.

Jasmine returns to her sister's apartment and finds Ginger back with Chili, who is now moving in. Jasmine and Chili needle each other, and Jasmine is furious when Ginger takes his side. Jasmine lies to Ginger, claiming that she is going to marry Dwight, and tells her she is moving out that day. Leaving the door open as she exits the apartment, she walks to a park bench, sits, and begins muttering to herself.

Cast

Production
In preparation for her role, Blanchett explained, "I did a lot of people watching. I drank my fair share of rosé. In the end I had to play the anti-heroine that Woody's written, but of course I thought about the Madoff scandal, because that's the holocaust of the financial crisis. And there are many, many women like that. I followed them like everybody else did, but as an actress you go back and you're slightly more forensic about those relationships."

The film was shot in 2012 in New York City and San Francisco. Letty Aronson, Stephen Tenenbaum, and Edward Walson served as the film's producers. Sony Pictures Classics distributed the film, marking the sixth collaboration between the label and Allen.

The outfits for Blanchett's Jasmine were an important part of her character and narrative, but they were difficult to assemble because of a very limited total costume budget of $35,000. To supplement this, costume designer Suzy Benzinger used her and Woody Allen's connections with various fashion houses to borrow some of the more expensive items for the production. These included Fendi, Chanel, Hermès, Oscar de la Renta and Carolina Herrera. Blanchett also helped, by using her relationship with Louis Vuitton to secure monogrammed luggage for the production, after Vuitton refused Benzinger's request. Karl Lagerfeld supplied two copies of the white Chanel bouclé jacket which Jasmine wears throughout the film, one brand new for the flashback scenes of Jasmine's affluent life in New York, and one for the San Francisco scenes which Benzinger distressed by soaking in fabric softener to give it the appearance of overuse.

Release
Blue Jasmine had a limited release at six theaters in Los Angeles and New York City on July 26, 2013, and expanded nationwide on August 23, 2013. Woody Allen refused to release the film in India because the country requires a blurb to be inserted at the bottom of any scenes during which a character is smoking. This is in addition to health warnings that are required to be shown at the beginning and end of the film.

Home media
Blue Jasmine was released on Blu-ray and DVD on January 21, 2014.

Reception

Box office
The film received a slow rollout, modeled after the release of Midnight in Paris; it was estimated to have grossed over US$600,000 in its first three days, which took place at six theaters in Los Angeles and New York City. It was Allen's "best-ever opening per-screen average" and the year's highest per-screen average, beating Spring Breakers "impressive debut on three screens".  The film grossed US$33.4 million in the United States and US$64.1 million in the rest of the world.

Critical response
Rotten Tomatoes reported that 91% of 234 critics gave the film a positive review, with an average rating of 8.10/10. The website's critical consensus states, "Woody Allen's Blue Jasmine finds the director in peak late-period form—and benefiting from a superb cast led by Cate Blanchett." Metacritic assigned the film a weighted average score of 78 out of 100 based on 47 critics, indicating "generally favorable reviews".

Early reviews suggested the film would be rated very highly among Allen's recent offerings, and praised Blanchett's performance as one of her strongest, if not the best of her career: David Denby of The New Yorker stated that "in all, this is the strongest, most resonant movie Woody Allen has made in years". Mick LaSalle, writing for the San Francisco Chronicle, wrote that "Blanchett in Blue Jasmine is beyond brilliant, beyond analysis. This is jaw-dropping work, what we go to the movies hoping to see, and we do. Every few years." Andrew Dice Clay's performance was also critically praised in the film.

Some critics have argued the film is Allen's response or tribute to the Tennessee Williams play A Streetcar Named Desire, as it shares a very similar plot and characters. It also features cast members who have previously been associated with the play: Baldwin played the role of Stanley Kowalski on stage in 1992 and in the 1995 adaptation of the play, while Blanchett played the leading role of Blanche DuBois in the Australian production of the play staged by the Sydney Theatre Company in 2008. Other critics and cultural commentators theorized that the story of Jasmine as a "shrill narcissist falling apart" and "in a crisis of self-flagellation after living in denial for years" was modeled on Allen's former companion, Mia Farrow, and that the film is a response to their high-profile and acrimonious break-up.

Accolades

At the 2014 Academy Awards ceremony, Blue Jasmine had three nominations: Best Actress for Blanchett, Best Supporting Actress for Hawkins and Best Original Screenplay for Allen. Blanchett was the sole winner. At the 2014 Golden Globe Awards ceremony, the film had two nominations: Best Actress in a Motion Picture – Drama for Blanchett and Best Supporting Actress – Motion Picture for Hawkins, with Blanchett going on to win. Blanchett also won Best Actress at the BAFTAs, Screen Actors Guild Awards, and Independent Spirit Awards. Allen's screenplay was also nominated at the Writers Guild of America Awards and the film was nominated for or won dozens of other awards worldwide.

References

External links

 
 
 
 
 

2013 comedy-drama films
2013 films
2013 independent films
Adultery in films
American comedy-drama films
American independent films
American nonlinear narrative films
Articles containing video clips
Films about narcissism
Films about sisters
Films about the upper class
Films directed by Woody Allen
Films featuring a Best Actress Academy Award-winning performance
Films featuring a Best Drama Actress Golden Globe-winning performance
Films produced by Letty Aronson
Films produced by Stephen Tenenbaum
Films set in New York City
Films set in San Francisco
Films shot in New York City
Films shot in San Francisco
Films with screenplays by Woody Allen
Sony Pictures Classics films
2010s English-language films
2010s American films